The msondo (or msondro) is a type of drum played in the Swahili-speaking world, including Zanzibar and Comoros. It is featured in the region's genre of taarab or twarab music.

Construction
The Zanzibari version is described as "a slightly tapered, open-ended drum approximately 3 feet tall"

The Comorian version is described as made of a terra-cotta pitcher topped with goatskin.

References

Tanzanian musical instruments
Comorian musical instruments
Hand drums